Speed skating at the 2007 Winter Universiade was held at the Oval Lingotto from 18 to 23 January 2007.

Medal summary

Medal table

Men's events

Women's events

Results

Men's 5000 metres

Women's 1500 metres

References

External links
Results book

2007 Winter Universiade
Winter Universiade
International speed skating competitions hosted by Italy
2007